Statistics of the Swedish football Division 2 for the 1990 season.

League standings

Division 2 Norra

Division 2 Östra

Division 2 Västra

Division 2 Södra

References
Sweden - List of final tables (Clas Glenning)

1990
3
Sweden
Sweden